The 1924 Montana State Bobcats football team was an American football team that represented Montana State College—now known as Montana State University—as a member of the Rocky Mountain Conference (RMC) during the 1924 college football season. In its third season under head coach G. Ott Romney, the team compiled an overall record of 5–1–1 with a mark of 1–1–1 against RMC opponents, tied for sixth place in the conference, shut out six of seven opponents, and outscored all opponents by a total of 274 to 18.

Schedule

References

Montana State
Montana State Bobcats football seasons
Montana State Bobcats football